Michał Bergson (Bergsohn), or Michel Bergson (20 May 18209 March 1898) was a Polish composer and pianist, promoter of Frédéric Chopin.

Biography 
Born in Warsaw, Bergson was the son of Gabriel Bereksohn, grandson of Berek and Temerl Bergson, and great-grandson of Samuel Zbytkower. His children included the influential French philosopher Henri Bergson and artist and occultist Moina Mathers, wife of Samuel Liddell MacGregor Mathers.

He learned from Friedrich Schneider, Carl Friedrich Rungenhagen, and Wilhelm Taubert and worked mainly in Italy and Switzerland. In 1863 Michal Bergson became professor at the Conservatory in Geneva, and later was its head. Bergson had by that time married a native of Yorkshire, Katherine Levison, they lived in London, England and France, finally settled there. He died in London.

Compositions
 Luisa di Montfort (performed in 1847) 
 'Scene and Air' from Luisa di Montfort for clarinet and piano
 Salvator Rosa
 Qui va à la chasse, perd sa place (1859)
 Mazurka, Opp. 1 and 48
 Le Rhin, Op. 21
 12 Études caractéristiques
 Concerto Symphonique pour piano avec orchestra, Op. 62 (performed 1868)

External links

Notes

19th-century Polish Jews
Michal
19th-century Polish composers
Polish classical pianists
Male classical pianists
Jewish classical pianists
Musicians from Warsaw
1820 births
1898 deaths
19th-century classical pianists
Male composers
19th-century Polish musicians
19th-century male musicians
19th-century musicians